Demetrius Alexander (born November 3, 1975) is an American retired professional basketball player. He played both power forward and center positions.

College career
Alexander played junior college basketball at the Hutchinson Community College before moving to the University of Alabama, where he graduated in 1998.

Professional career
He arrived in Europe in 2000, signing with Hapoel Galil Elyon of the Israeli Basketball Super League. He also played later in Israel with Hapoel Jerusalem B.C. and Haifa/Nesher BC. For the 2002–03 season he signed with Pallalcesto Amatori Udine of the Italian Lega Basket Serie A.

For the 2005–06 season he signed with Changwon LG Sakers of the Korean Basketball League. In April 2006 he signed with Élan Béarnais Pau-Orthez of the French League for the rest of the season.

In the summer of 2006 he signed with Caja San Fernando of the Spanish ACB League for the 2006–07 season. Between 2007 and 2009 he played with Barons/LMT Rīga of the Latvian Basketball League. In February 2009, he signed with BC Donetsk of Ukraine for the rest of the 2008–09 season.

For the 2009–10 season Alexander signed with Kavala B.C. of Greece, but he left them in January 2010, and signed with BC Azovmash of Ukraine. In July 2010, he re-signed with them for one more season. In December 2010, he was named Eurocup MVP for Round 3.

In January 2012, he signed with Bnei HaSharon of Israel. However, he left them after only one game and returned to United States to play with St. Louis Phoenix.

Awards and accomplishments

High school
Missouri High School Player of the Year :1994

Pro career
FIBA EuroCup Champion: (2008)
Latvian League Champion: (2007–08)
Super League Champion: (2009–10)
Japan Basketball League MVP (2000)
Latvian Basketball League MVP (2008)
Ukrainian SuperLeague All-Star Game (2009)
Ukrainian SuperLeague All-Star Game MVP (2009)
French League All-Star Game (2006)
FIBA EuroCup All-Star Day (2008)

References

External links
ACB.com Profile
Eurocupbasketball.com Profile

1975 births
Living people
African-American basketball players
Alabama Crimson Tide men's basketball players
American expatriate basketball people in France
American expatriate basketball people in Greece
American expatriate basketball people in Israel
American expatriate basketball people in Italy
American expatriate basketball people in Japan
American expatriate basketball people in Latvia
American expatriate basketball people in South Korea
American expatriate basketball people in Spain
American expatriate basketball people in Ukraine
American men's basketball players
Basketball players from St. Louis
Baloncesto Fuenlabrada players
BC Azovmash players
BC Donetsk players
BK Barons players
Bnei HaSharon players
CB Valladolid players
Changwon LG Sakers players
Élan Béarnais players
Hapoel Galil Elyon players
Hapoel Jerusalem B.C. players
Idaho Stampede (CBA) players
Hutchinson Blue Dragons men's basketball players
Kavala B.C. players
Liga ACB players
Pallalcesto Amatori Udine players
Real Betis Baloncesto players
San Diego Stingrays players
Centers (basketball)
Power forwards (basketball)
21st-century African-American sportspeople
20th-century African-American sportspeople